Salsa is a 1988 romance film directed by Boaz Davidson and starring Robby Rosa, Rodney Harvey, Angela Alvarado and Miranda Garrison. The film, about a Puerto Rican dancer who decides to enter a salsa dancing contest, earned a Razzie Award nomination for Rosa as Worst New Star.

Plot
In a nightly escape from his day job as a mechanic, Rico (Robby Rosa) enters his true element: the wild exuberance of "La Luna" , a salsa club located in East Los Angeles, California. Dreaming of making himself and Vicky (Angela Alvarado), his girlfriend the "King and Queen of Salsa", Rico pours all his energy into winning La Luna's Grand Salsa Competition. But when Luna (Miranda Garrison), the club's gorgeous owner sets her sights on making Rico her dance partner, Rico must decide what drives him, his ambition or his heart.

Cast

As themselves

Reception
On review aggregator Rotten Tomatoes, the film has a 20% approval rating based on five reviews.

Soundtrack
 "Margarita" - H. Wilkins
 "Chicos y chicas" - Mavis Vegas Davis
 "Cali Pachanguero" - Grupo Niche
 "Your Love" - Laura Branigan
 "Good Lovin'" - Kenny Ortega, Chain Reaction, The Edwin Hawkins Singers
 "Under My Skin" - Robby Rosa
 "Oye Como Va" - Tito Puente
 "I Know" - Marisela Esqueda, The Edwin Hawkins Singers
 "Spanish Harlem" - Ben E. King
 "Puerto Rico" - Bobby Caldwell, Marisela Esqueda, Michael Sembello, H. Wilkins, Mongo Santamaría, Charlie Palmieri, The Edwin Hawkins Singers

References

External links
  at MGM.com
 
 
 
 

1988 films
1980s dance films
1980s musical drama films
1980s romantic musical films
American dance films
American musical drama films
American romantic drama films
American romantic musical films
Films directed by Boaz Davidson
Films set in Los Angeles
Films shot in Los Angeles
Golan-Globus films
Salsa
1988 drama films
Films produced by Menahem Golan
Films produced by Yoram Globus
1980s English-language films
Films with screenplays by Boaz Davidson
1980s American films